(KOF 2000, or KOF '00) is a  fighting video game that was produced by SNK for the Neo Geo arcade and home consoles in 2000. It is the seventh installment in The King of Fighters series for the Neo Geo and the final game in the series SNK produced before the original company's bankruptcy. The game was ported to the Dreamcast (in Japan only) and the PlayStation 2 in 2002. The game's story, a sequel to The King of Fighters '99 and the second part of the "NESTS Chronicles" story arc, focuses on a new tournament held by the commander of the Ikari Warriors, Heidern, who seeks to capture and interrogate former NESTS agents K' and Maxima into revealing crucial and critical information about the NESTS cartel. The gameplay retains the Striker system of the previous games in the series, but the assisting character can also cooperate with the playable character to generate combos.

SNK entered into bankruptcy while The King of Fighters 2000 was still in development, resulting in glitches and bugs remaining in the game because staff members—most notably producer Takashi Nishiyama—left the company before the game was complete. SNK attempted to add further depth to the NESTS cast with K's new enemy Kula Diamond; other new characters like Vanessa and Seth were intended to attract different audiences. The PlayStation 2 version of the game was released in North America and in Europe in a two-in-one bundle with its immediate sequel, The King of Fighters 2001, as the first two games to be published by SNK Playmore USA. In Europe, the bundle was published by Ignition Entertainment.

Critical reception to the game's fighting system and characters has been mostly positive due to the improvements SNK brought to the franchise. There were mixed reactions to the company's handling of the graphics and backgrounds, which divided reviewers opinions about its status as one of the best games of the series. Two novelizations and an audio drama have also been published in Japan.

Gameplay

The gameplay in The King of Fighters 2000 is based on that of The King of Fighters '99; it expands on the "Striker Match" format introduced in its predecessor. The game has an Active Striker System, which allows the player to summon a Striker member in any situation, whether the player is attacking or being attacked by the opponent, allowing the player to use his or her strikers in combos. The player can also replenish Strike Bombs by either losing rounds or taunting the opponent.

The player now has two choices after selecting the Striker member of the team; he or she can choose to use the regular character or an alternate character officially known as Another Striker, a character used exclusively for striker attacks. These alternative Strikers are characters from previous KOF games and other SNK titles such as Fio Germi from Metal Slug 2, King Lion from Savage Reign, Kim Kaphwan's grandson Kim Sue Il from Kizuna Encounter, Gai Tendo from Buriki One, Kaede from The Last Blade, Rocky from Robo Army, Duke Edwards from Burning Fight and Kim Kaphwan's son Kim Dong-Hwan and Kim Jae-Hoon from Garou: Mark of the Wolves, as well as alternative versions of in-game characters such as K', Iori Yagami and Robert Garcia. There is another set of alternative Striker characters known as Maniac Strikers, which are selected in the arcade version by entering codes for notable characters only. The console versions includes additional Maniac Strikers by completing a certain number of matches in the "Party Mode".

Plot and characters

After an incident at the previous tournament, the commander of the Ikari Warriors Team, Heidern, is determined to investigate the objective of the NESTS cartel and stop it from achieving its ruthless ambition. Ling, a fellow commander and long-time friend of Heidern, tells him that K′ and Maxima were once NESTS operatives and that they may hold the key to locating the whereabouts of the mysterious organization. Using this information, Heidern decides to focus his efforts into using the next KOF tournament to lure both K′ and Maxima out of hiding so that they can be captured and interrogated by him for crucial and critical information about the NESTS cartel.

Depending on the player's performance during the tournament, Kula Diamond might appear to eliminate K', but fails from within her mission. Shortly afterwards, Ling and a couple of his associates suddenly attack and betray Heidern near the end of the tournament, the former revealing himself to be a clone of the real Ling who was murdered in the past and being replaced via the machinations of a high-ranking NESTS member named Zero, who seeks to destroy NESTS itself and create a new world order under his own rule. Through the accumulated fighting power he had gathered during the tournament, Zero initiates and utilizes a space-based satellite weapon named the "Zero Cannon", with which he sends a powerful energy blast from it straight towards Earth, destroying most of South Town via the energy blast's explosive impact upon it. After Zero's defeat in combat, he attempts but fails to use the cannon again while Heidern swiftly and forcibly removes the clone Ling's remote control of the cannon while dispatching him in the process. If the player defeats Kula previously, her supporters Diana and Foxy stop Zero while Kula destroys the Zero Cannon herself.

Here are the list of the fighters with their corresponding Striker, Another Striker and Maniac Striker.

K’ Team (Hero Team)
K'
Another K’
Krizalid
Maxima 
Rocky
Vanessa
Fio
Ramón 
Duke Edwards
Neo & Geo
Benimaru Team
Benimaru Nikaido 
Another Benimaru
Orochi Iori
Shingo Yabuki 
Cosplayer Kyoko
Seth
Goro Daimon
Lin
Eiji Kisaragi
Fatal Fury Team
Terry Bogard 
Geese Howard
Brian Battler
Andy Bogard 
Billy Kane
Lucky Glauber
Joe Higashi
Duck King
Heavy-D!
Blue Mary
Ryuji Yamazaki

Art of Fighting Team 
Ryo Sakazaki 
Kaede
G – Mantle
Robert Garcia
Another Robert
King 
King Lion
Takuma Sakazaki 
Gai Tendo
Mr. Big
Women Fighters Team
Mai Shiranui 
Chizuru Kagura
Wolfgang Krauser
Yuri Sakazaki
Nakoruru
Kasumi Todoh
Li Xiangfei
Unknown
Ryuhaku Todoh
Hinako Shijou
Lilly Kane
Ikari Warriors Team
Leona Heidern 
Goenitz
Orochi
Ralf Jones 
Yashiro Nanakase
Orochi Leona
Clark Still 
Shermie
Whip 
Chris
Heidern

Psycho Soldier Team
Athena Asamiya 
Athena
Sie Kensou 
Sie “Psycho Soldier” Kensou
Chin Gentsai 
Baitang
Bao 
Kaoru Watabe
Korea Justice Team
Kim Kaphwan 
Kim Sue Il
Chang Koehan 
Kim Dong Hwan
Smart Chang
Choi Bounge 
Kim Jae Hoon
Cool Choi
Jhun Hoon 
Kang Baedal
Single Entry 
Kyo Kusanagi 
Syo Kirishima
Saisyu Kusanagi
Iori Yagami 
Mature & Vice
Another Iori
Mid-Boss
Kula Diamond 
Candy Diamond
Foxy
Rugal Bernstein
Final Boss
Cloned Zero

Development and release
SNK began making plans for The King of Fighters 2000 in June 1999. Former producer Takashi Nishiyama was absent from the team for the first time in the series. Because previous regulars from The King of Fighters games were not playable, SNK took advantage of the striker system and give players the choice of using Goro Daimon among others as alternative assisting characters. SNK found the Bogard brothers, Terry and Andy, unbalanced in the previous game because one of them was  overpowered as a striker; the company joked that this was also a result of the love between the siblings.

One of the game developers said the team originally wanted to use more of the characters from The King of Fighters '99 but due to licensing issues it was not possible. The arcade version was nearing completion in mid-2000, with the staff becoming excited at the quality of the game. Despite early negative thoughts about the game's state, SNK was pleased with the completed title, citing the arcade as an appealing game. Following its release, SNK thanked the fans for their support. During the game's development, SNK went bankrupt, leading to the designers of the game causing multiple glitches, extra animations, and balancing issues. Some of the developers left the company, which resulted in the team in charge of the game becoming smaller.

New characters were created to appeal to different audiences. The Mexican wrestler Ramon was made to appeal to South Americans because the Neo Geo was very popular in South America. Ramon's designer loved pro-wrestling fighting moves but the character's techniques were made unrealistic. Vanessa and Seth were originally set to appear in The King of Fighters '99 but they debuted on its Dreamcast port as strikers, while becoming playable in 2000. Vanessa was created to appeal to women; she is slightly older than the other characters, which players found appealing. Both the debuting Lin and the unplayable Ron generated a major surprise to the SNK staff because their addition to the story was not overlooked. Kula Diamond was created to give a major expansion to the NESTS cartel, while Zero was made to contrast with the NESTS agent Krizalid from The King of Fighters '99, who had a darker personality. SNK, however, was disappointed with Zero, leading to the creation of  stronger new character connected with him in the next game.

The arcade version of the game was released on July 26, 2000, for the MVS Circuit Board. The game was then ported to the Neo Geo and released on December 21 of that year. The Sega Dreamcast port was released on August 8, 2002, while the PlayStation 2 version was made available on November 28 that year. The ports included new striker characters and new backgrounds. For the North American version, the game was not available to the public until 2003 and released the PlayStation 2 game alongside The King of Fighters 2001 was the one of the first games published by SNK Playmore USA. There has been censorship, including the removal of Whip's  gun and the movement of Mai Shiranui's cleavage. The Neo-Geo and Sega Dreamcast versions of the game were included in The King of Fighters NESTS Hen, a compilation released for the Sony PlayStation 2 in Japan. The PlayStation 2 version was re-released on May 3, 2016, for the PlayStation 4 through the PlayStation Network. The game was later released on the Nintendo Switch through the Nintendo eShop service on August 10, 2017.

Reception
{{Video game reviews
| GR = 
| IGN = 7.4/10
| GSpot = 7.8
| Fam = 
| NLife = 7/10
| rev1 = Bonus Stage
| rev1Score = 9/10
| rev2 = Pure Nintendo| rev2Score = 7.5/10
}}

In Japan, Game Machine listed The King of Fighters 2000 on their September 1, 2000, issue as being the second-most-successful arcade game of the month.

The PlayStation 2 port of The King of Fighters 2000 sold 37,316 units in Japan during 2002. In 2017, it became one of the most downloaded games of the PlayStation Classic collection.

Critical reception for the game's fighting system has been mostly positive. GameSpot said SNK improved most of the problems of its predecessor The King of Fighters '99 by adding more gameplay features such as new attacks and new additions to the Striker system. The reviewer said fans might either like or dislike the new characters based on the differences between them and the characters from The King of Fighters '99, and said the boss Zero is less overpowered than Krizalid but lacks his appeal. IGN agreed with GameSpot in terms of the Striker system and liked the additional characters, making it one of the best games of the franchise. In another review, IGN stated that the game offered many good new characters, particularly Lin. Nintendo Life also liked the addition of the Striker system because of the newly possible combos but said the game did not live up to the previous games. Pure Nintendo compared it negatively with Capcom's fighting game Street Fighter II but still said The King of Fighters 2000 provided enough depth thanks to its character roster and gameplay mechanics, making it a good addition to Nintendo Switch's games. Bonus Stage regarded it as one of the best games from SNK, saying it might appeal to gamers who previously enjoyed the predecessor and Garou: Mark of the Wolves.

The game's presentation drew mixed reactions. While Pure Nintendo enjoyed the character designs, backgrounds, and theme songs, IGN said these elements appeared dated due to similarities with those of previous installments and the improved graphics of new consoles. GameSpot said while SNK attempted to improve the designs of the characters, the quality was still not as appealing as it should have been and that the background stages felt hollow. Echoing IGN comments, Bonus Stage stated that despite being a fighting game, the plot amazed fans because of the further exploration of NESTS organization, which is briefly explored in The King of Fighters '99, and said the game's storyline offers such an appealing dark ending that most of the fans wanted to play the following and final game from the NESTS saga to see its conclusion. HardcoreGaming found the PlayStation 2 port of the game superior to the Dreamcast version because the former fixed some slowdown issues and said Kyo Kusanagi's theme "Goodbye Esaka" was one of the best themes performed by SNK.

An audio drama CD was released by Scitron Digital Contents on September 20, 2000. It features two storylines: one exploring the first encounter between K' and Kula Diamond; the second story focuses on Athena Asamiya as she meets rivals in an airport. Series' writer Akihiko Ureshino wrote two light novels published by Kadokawa Shoten. The first novel, Strikers Strike Back, acts as a self-parody of the game's storyline and was released on February 19, 2001. The second novel, Icicle Doll, was released on December 20 the same year and features a more serious storyline.

 Notes 

References

 External links 
 
 The King of Fighters 2000 at GameFAQs
 The King of Fighters 2000 at Giant Bomb
 The King of Fighters 2000 at Killer List of Videogames
 The King of Fighters 2000 at MobyGames
 The King of Fighters 2000/2001'' at MobyGames

2000 video games
2D fighting games
ACA Neo Geo games
Arcade video games
Neo Geo games
Nintendo Switch games
Dreamcast games
PlayStation 2 games
PlayStation Network games
PlayStation 4 games
SNK games
SNK Playmore games
The King of Fighters games
Video games set in Egypt
Video games set in Korea
Video games with AI-versus-AI modes
Multiplayer and single-player video games
Video games developed in Japan
Xbox One games
Hamster Corporation games